FC UkrAhroKom Holovkivka is a former professional Ukrainian football club that plays its home games in the village of Holovkivka in the Oleksandriya District, Kirovohrad Oblast. The club is owned by UkrAhroKom, a Ukrainian agricultural company.

Prior to the start of 2014–15 Ukrainian First League season, UkrAhroKom Holovkivka was merged with PFC Oleksandriya, who were also competing in the Ukrainian First League into one club, and renamed themselves as FC Oleksandriya.

History

The club was founded in 2010 and entered the second group of the Kirovograd Oblast championship.

In 2009, the club continued to compete in the Kirovohrad oblast championship.
In May 2009, the team won the Kirovograd oblast Cup, and was granted the right to participate in the Ukrainian Amateur Cup, of where they reached the semifinals. In the 2009 Kirovohrad oblast championship, they finished second.

In 2010, the club won their second consecutive Kirovograd oblast Cup. The club announced its intention to become an professional one, and enter the Ukrainian Second League championship for the 2011–2012 season.

On June 20, 2011, the Central Council of the PFL team accepted the team's professional status. Originally, the club registered its address in the village of Pryiutivka in the Oleksandriya District, Kirovohrad oblast, which was around 40 kilometers away, for the 2012–13 Ukrainian Second League season, the club re-registered using the address in Holovkivka.
The club would be promoted to the Ukrainian First League in 2013.

Stadium
Home matches are held at the "Holovkivskyy" stadium, which has a capacity of 580 spectators and was opened on October 12, 2008.

Honors

Ukrainian Druha Liha
 Winners (1): 2012–13 (Group B)

Kirovohrad Oblast Championship
Winners (1): 2010
Runners-up (1): 2009

Kirovohrad Oblast Cup
Winners (3): 2009, 2010, 2011

League and Cup history

{|class="wikitable"
|-bgcolor="#efefef"
! Season
! Div.
! Pos.
! Pl.
! W
! D
! L
! GS
! GA
! P
!Domestic Cup
!colspan=2|Europe
!Notes
|-
|align=center|2010
|align=center|4th Gr.2
|align=center|3
|align=center|6
|align=center|2
|align=center|1
|align=center|3
|align=center|7
|align=center|14
|align=center|7
|align=center|Amateur's Cup
|align=center|
|align=center|
|align=center|
|-
|align=center|2011
|align=center|4th Gr.2
|align=center|4
|align=center|10
|align=center|5
|align=center|0
|align=center|5
|align=center|20
|align=center|12
|align=center|15
|align=center|—
|align=center|
|align=center|
|align=center|
|-
|align=center|2011–12
|align=center|3rd "A"
|align=center|5
|align=center|26
|align=center|14
|align=center|6
|align=center|6
|align=center|43
|align=center|25
|align=center|36
|align=center|1/32 finals
|align=center|
|align=center|
|align=center|
|-
|align=center rowspan="2"|2012–13
|align=center|3rd "B"
|align=center|1
|align=center|24 	
|align=center|15 		
|align=center|5 	  	
|align=center|4 	 	
|align=center|38 		
|align=center|17 		 	
|align=center|50
|align=center rowspan=2|1/8 finals
|align=center|
|align=center|
|align=center|
|-
|align=center|3rd "2"
|align=center bgcolor=gold|1
|align=center|34 	
|align=center|20 	 		
|align=center|7 	
|align=center|7 		
|align=center|51 	
|align=center|25 	
|align=center|67
|align=center|
|align=center|
|align=center bgcolor=green|Promoted
|-
|align=center|2013–14
|align=center|2nd
|align=center|8
|align=center|30
|align=center|11
|align=center|9
|align=center|10
|align=center|27
|align=center|27
|align=center|42
|align=center|1/16 finals
|align=center|
|align=center|
|align=center bgcolor=lightgrey|Merged with PFC Oleksandriya
|}

External links
 Official team website

References

UkrAhroKom Holovkivka
2010 establishments in Ukraine
Association football clubs established in 2010
Football clubs in Kirovohrad Oblast